Pterygoid muscle may refer to:
 Lateral pterygoid muscle
 Medial pterygoid muscle